Sarah Hawkins is a British phonetician and Emeritus Professor of Speech and Music Science at Cambridge University. She is a Fellow of the Acoustical Society of America.

References

British phonologists
Living people
Year of birth missing (living people)
Women linguists
Academics of the University of Cambridge
Phoneticians
Linguists from the United Kingdom
British psychologists